Michael Cullen (born 1967 near Lowestoft, England), aka Mike Dred, is a British experimental techno DJ, producer, and sound engineer. He has been a leading DJ since 1983, a producer since 1988, a sound designer since 1992, and is considered an important figure in the development of acid techno and innovative use of the Roland TB-303.

He is also known as The Kosmik Kommando, Universal Indicator, Chimera, Machine Codes, Space Avenge. He was the first artist other than Richard D. James to release a project on Rephlex. His clear vinyl "Kosmik Kommando EP" was the third release, and was given a catalogue number CAT007 on account of his interest in James Bond. In addition, the Universal Indicator records released on Rephlex are amongst the most collectible recordings in the history of techno music. Mike Dred established the Machine Codes record label in 1990 and also recorded for R&S Records and R&S Records offshoot Diatomyc from 1992 to 1997. From 1994 to 1999, he collaborated extensively with the electro-acoustic artist Peter Green and also produced a one-off collaboration with techno producer Dr. Fernando. In 2012 he recorded the Overmind LP for De:Tuned in Antwerp and has contributed to both sought after De:Tuned Box Set compilations.

Acclaim 

In 2005, Mike Dred received an MSc with Distinction in Sound Design. Mike Dred was the first DJ producer to get sponsored by the Arts Council of Great Britain and the National Lottery. His works are often used for educational purposes and a selection is part of the prestigious Music Performance Research Centre (MPRC) collection at the Barbican Centre, London. UK. The publication ' The Rough Guide to Techno', described Mike as "The Jimi Hendrix of the 303" and "Full on Acid Genius".

As well as presenting new developments in electronic and computer music, Mike has also given lectures on Sound Design and Synthesis. Mike is the inspiration behind Electroacoustic Music being represented on a more popular level after the 1995 Beyond The Box EP with Peter Green. His works with Peter Green dating from 1995 educated & inspired the likes of Richard D. James, a.k.a. Aphex Twin, to discover the genre culminating in the signing of LPs by Robert Normandeau, Senior Lecturer in Acoustics and Electroacoustics at the Universite de Montreal, Canada and experimentalist Pierre Bastien from France. This helped further establish Rephlex Records as the premier UK electronic label. Mike Dred and Peter Green's early sonic experiments prompted Dave Robinson, then Editor of Future Music (November 1995, Issue 37), to write: "We boldly call ourselves Future Music. But how often do we bring you something so forward-looking, yet at the same time so contemporary that it might - just might set the agenda for the next post-techno, post-analogue phase?"

Mike Dred was on the SPNM composer short list for 2005 to 2008 using his given name Michael Cullen.

Discography

As Kosmik Kommando
Kosmik Kommando ep (Rephlex Records, CAT007) EP (vinyl) 1992
Freaquenseize (Rephlex Records, CAT010) 2XLP, 2XCD 1993
Universal Indicator Yellow (1993)
Universal Indicator 5 (Ultra-Violet) 1992 / 2000
Analogue Android (2011)

As Mike Dred
 Rock The People EP (Machine Codes) 1990
 Fu Chin Ra EP (Machine Codes, CODE A) 1993
 Kosmik KonundrumsEP (Machine Codes, CODE B) 1994
 CODE C EP. (Machine Codes, CODE C) 1994
 Beyond The Box EP (with Peter Green) (Machine Codes CODE D) 1995
 EPNOM BYMON EP (with Peter Green) (Machine Codes CODE E) 1996
 DJ Mike Dred - 98K Live (Rephlex Records, CAT069) EP (vinyl)
 Mike Dred & Peter Green - Virtual Farmer (Rephlex Records, CAT070)

As Universal Indicator
Blue (1992)
Innovation in the Dynamics of Acid (2001)

As Chimera
Untitled 4 Track White Label (Rephlex Records, 1993)
Valley of the Spirits / The Future is Upon US (Rephlex Records) 1993
Valley of the Spirits (Rephlex Records, CAT012)CDLP 1993
Out of the Valley EP (Machine Codes. CHIME 2T. 1996)
Shen Circuits (Veil of the Spirits) EP. (Machine Codes, CODE 1110) Digital Release 2016
Cabeus EP. (Machine Codes CODE 1111) Digital Release 2017
Fireside Phoenix EP. (Machine Codes CODE x10) Digital Release 2017

References

External links
 Discogs

Living people
1967 births
English DJs
English record producers
English audio engineers
People from Lowestoft
Alumni of the University of Edinburgh
Rephlex Records artists